Shao Jiayi (born 10 April 1980) is a Chinese former professional footballer who played as a midfielder. He represented Beijing Guoan (two spells), TSV 1860 Munich, Energie Cottbus and MSV Duisburg as well as the China national team with which he participated in the 2000 AFC Asian Cup, 2002 FIFA World Cup and 2004 AFC Asian Cup.

Club career
Shao Jiayi started his football career in the 1999 league season playing for top-tier side Beijing Guoan where then manager Shen Xiangfu promoted him to the first team. Despite a change in management with Milovan Đorić and Wei Kexing coming in the following season, Shao gradually started to establish himself as regular within the team and due to his commanding presence in centre midfield, he was touted as one of the most exciting players in Chinese football. He then helped guide the club to the 2000 Chinese FA Cup final where they lost 4–2 on aggregate against Chongqing Lifan. After his breakout 2000 season, Shao became a vital member of the team's midfield and once again helped guide the club to another Chinese FA Cup final in 2001 where this time they faced Dalian Shide, losing 4–1 on aggregate.

After playing in the 2002 FIFA World Cup, Shao gathered enough attention to impress Bundesliga side 1860 Munich, who signed him on four-year loan deal from Beijing. A permanent transfer was made on 14 January 2003, reported to be approximately €1.3 million. Shao played there for three-and-a-half seasons before transferring to Energie Cottbus, signing a three-year contract on 13 July 2006.

He scored his first goals for Energie Cottbus at home against Hertha BSC and away to Borussia Dortmund after coming on as a substitute in both matches. After extending his stay with Energie Cottbus for two more seasons, on 30 June 2011, Shao signed with 2. Bundesliga side MSV Duisburg and made his debut for the club on 17 July 2011 in a 3–2 loss against Karlsruher SC.

On 13 December 2011, Shao returned to the Chinese Super League to rejoin his former club Beijing Guoan after playing nine years in Germany. On 29 October 2015, Shao announced that he had decided to retire from football.

International career
Shao's performances with Beijing Guoan led to him being called up by then manager Bora Milutinović to the Chinese national team and was included in the squad that placed fourth in the 2000 AFC Asian Cup. Shao found more success with the national team when he was included in the squad that secured qualification for the 2002 FIFA World Cup. At the tournament, he played in two games – receiving a red card against Turkey – while China were knocked out of the group stage. Shao was also a key player for the national team in the 2004 AFC Asian Cup where he scored three goals during the tournament which led China to finish as runners-up.

Career statistics

Club

International

Scores and results list China's goal tally first, score column indicates score after each Shao goal.

Honours

Individual
 AFC Asian Cup All-Star Team: 2004
 Chinese Jia-A League Team of the Year: 2002
 AFC Asian Cup Fans' All Time Best XI: 2018

References

External links

 Our 2010 target Shao Jiayi, FIFA, 29 October 2007
 
 

1980 births
Living people
Chinese footballers
Footballers from Beijing
China international footballers
Association football midfielders
2002 FIFA World Cup players
2000 AFC Asian Cup players
2004 AFC Asian Cup players
2007 AFC Asian Cup players
Expatriate footballers in Germany
Chinese Super League players
Beijing Guoan F.C. players
TSV 1860 Munich players
FC Energie Cottbus players
MSV Duisburg players
Chinese expatriate footballers
Bundesliga players
2. Bundesliga players
Chinese expatriate sportspeople in Germany
Beijing Guoan F.C. non-playing staff